James Tringrove (25 November 1907 – 11 September 1979) was an Australian cricketer. He played three first-class matches for Tasmania between 1932 and 1939.

See also
 List of Tasmanian representative cricketers

References

External links
 

1907 births
1979 deaths
Australian cricketers
Tasmania cricketers
Cricketers from Hobart